Ana Flávia Chritaro Daniel Sanglard (born 20 June 1970) is a  Brazilian female volleyball player.

She was part of the Brazil women's national volleyball team at the 1996 Summer Olympics and 1996 Summer Olympics, winning the bronze medal in 1996.

She also competed at the 1998 FIVB Volleyball Women's World Championship in Japan. She played with Minas Tênis Clube.

References

External links
http://www.legavolleyfemminile.it/?page_id=194&idat=SAN-ANA-70
https://web.archive.org/web/20120527063135/http://voleibrasil.org.br/por-onde-anda/Ana+Flavia/16/
http://sportv.globo.com/site/programas/sportv-reporter/noticia/2012/05/ex-jogadora-da-selecao-brasileira-de-volei-vive-procura-de-novos-talentos.html

1970 births
Living people
Brazilian women's volleyball players
Place of birth missing (living people)
Olympic volleyball players of Brazil
Volleyball players at the 1996 Summer Olympics
Volleyball players at the 1992 Summer Olympics
Olympic medalists in volleyball
Olympic bronze medalists for Brazil
Medalists at the 1996 Summer Olympics
Setters (volleyball)
Pan American Games medalists in volleyball
Pan American Games silver medalists for Brazil
Medalists at the 1991 Pan American Games